Mike Liljegren is an American football coach.  He served as the head football coach at North Park University in Chicago for six seasons, from 1995 to 2000, compiling a record of 9–46.

Head coaching record

College

References

Year of birth missing (living people)
Living people
Illinois College Blueboys football coaches
North Park Vikings football coaches
North Park University alumni
High school football coaches in Illinois